Martin John Rees, Baron Rees of Ludlow   (born 23 June 1942) is a British cosmologist and astrophysicist. He is the fifteenth Astronomer Royal, appointed in 1995, and was Master of Trinity College, Cambridge, from 2004 to 2012 and President of the Royal Society between 2005 and 2010.

Education and early life
Rees was born on 23 June 1942 in York, England. After a peripatetic life during the war his parents, both teachers, settled with Rees, an only child, in a rural part of Shropshire near the border with Wales. There, his parents founded Bedstone College, a boarding school based on progressive educational concepts. He was educated at Bedstone College, then from the age of 13 at Shrewsbury School. He studied for the mathematical tripos at Trinity College, Cambridge, graduating with first class honours. He then undertook post-graduate research at Cambridge and completed a PhD supervised by Dennis Sciama in 1967. Rees' post-graduate work in astrophysics in the mid-1960s coincided with an explosion of new discoveries, with breakthroughs ranging from confirmation of the Big Bang, the discovery of neutron stars and black holes, and a host of other revelations.

Career and research
After holding postdoctoral research positions in the United Kingdom and the United States, he was a professor at Sussex University, during 1972–1973, and then moved to Cambridge, where he was the Plumian Professor at the University of Cambridge until 1991, and the director of the Institute of Astronomy.

He was professor of astronomy at Gresham College, London, in 1975 and became a Fellow of the Royal Society in 1979. From 1992 to 2003, he was Royal Society Research Professor, and from 2003 Professor of Cosmology and Astrophysics. He was Master of Trinity College, Cambridge, during 2004–2012. He is an Honorary Fellow of Darwin College, King's College, Clare Hall, Robinson College and Jesus College, Cambridge.

Rees is the author of more than 500 research papers, and he has made contributions to the origin of cosmic microwave background radiation, as well as to galaxy clustering and formation. His studies of the distribution of quasars led to final disproof of steady state theory.

He was one of the first to propose that enormous black holes power quasars, and that superluminal astronomical observations can be explained as an optical illusion caused by an object moving partly in the direction of the observer.

Since the 1990s, Rees has worked on gamma-ray bursts, especially in collaboration with Peter Mészáros, and on how the "cosmic dark ages" ended when the first stars formed. Since the 1970s he has been interested in anthropic reasoning, and the possibility that our visible universe is part of a vaster "multiverse".

Rees is an author of books on astronomy and science intended for the lay public and gives many public lectures and broadcasts. In 2010 he was invited to deliver the Reith Lectures for the BBC, now published as From Here to Infinity: Scientific Horizons. Rees thinks the search for extraterrestrial intelligence is worthwhile and has chaired the advisory board for the "Breakthrough Listen" project.

In addition to expansion of his scientific interests, Rees has written and spoken extensively about the problems and challenges of the 21st century, and interfaces between science, ethics, and politics. He is a member of the Board of the Institute for Advanced Study, in Princeton and the Oxford Martin School. He co-founded the Centre for the Study of Existential Risk and serves on the Scientific Advisory Board for the Future of Life Institute. He has formerly been a Trustee of the British Museum, the Science Museum, the Gates Cambridge Trust and the Institute for Public Policy Research (IPPR).

In August 2014, Rees was one of 200 public figures who were signatories to a letter to The Guardian expressing their hope that Scotland would vote to remain part of the United Kingdom in September's referendum on that issue.

In 2015, he was co-author of the report that launched the Global Apollo Programme, which calls for developed nations to commit to spending 0.02% of their GDP for 10 years, to fund coordinated research to make carbon-free baseload electricity less costly than electricity from coal by the year 2025.

His doctoral students have included Roger Blandford, Craig Hogan, Nick Kaiser Priyamvada Natarajan, and James E. Pringle.

Selected bibliography
 Cosmic Coincidences: Dark Matter, Mankind, and Anthropic Cosmology (co-author John Gribbin), 1989, Bantam; 
 New Perspectives in Astrophysical Cosmology, 1995; 
 Before the Beginning – Our Universe and Others, 1997; 
 Just Six Numbers: The Deep Forces That Shape the Universe, 1999; 
 Our Cosmic Habitat, 2001; 
 Our Final Hour: A Scientist's Warning: How Terror, Error, and Environmental Disaster Threaten Humankind's Future In This Century—On Earth and Beyond (UK title: Our Final Century: Will the Human Race Survive the Twenty-first Century?), 2003; 
 What We Still Don't Know  yet to be published.
 From Here to Infinity: Scientific Horizons, 2011; 
 On the Future: Prospects for Humanity, October 2018, Princeton University Press; 
  (Online version is titled "How astronomers revolutionized our view of the cosmos".)
 The End of Astronauts (co-author Donald Goldsmith), 2020, Harvard University Press ISBN 9780674257726
 If Science is to Save us, 2020, Polity Press ISBN: 9781509554201
 Rees, M.,"Cosmology and High Energy Astrophysics: A 50 year Perspective on Personality, Progress, and Prospects", Annual Review of Astronomy and Astrophysics, vol. 60:1–30, 2022.

Honours and awards 
He has been president of the Royal Astronomical Society (1992–94) and the British Science Association (1995–96), and was a Member of Council of the Royal Institution of Great Britain until 2010. Rees has received honorary degrees from a number of universities including Hull, Sussex, Uppsala, Toronto, Durham, Oxford, Cambridge, Harvard, Yale, Melbourne and Sydney. He belongs to several foreign academies, including the US National Academy of Sciences, the Russian Academy of Sciences, the Pontifical Academy of Sciences, the Royal Netherlands Academy of Arts and Sciences, the Science Academy of Turkey and the Japan Academy. He became president of the Royal Society on 1 December 2005 and continued until the end of the Society's 350th Anniversary Celebrations in 2010. In 2011, he was awarded the Templeton Prize. In 2005, Rees was elevated to a life peerage, sitting as a crossbencher in the House of Lords as Baron Rees of Ludlow, of Ludlow in the County of Shropshire. In 2005, he was awarded the Crafoord Prize. Other awards and honours include:

Elected to the American Academy of Arts and Sciences (1975)
Elected to the National Academy of Sciences (1982)
Heineman Prize (1984)
Gold Medal of the Royal Astronomical Society (1987)
Balzan Prize (1989) for High Energy Astrophysics
Knight Bachelor (1992)
Bruce Medal (1993)
Elected to the American Philosophical Society (1993)
Honorary doctorate from the Faculty of Science and Technology at Uppsala University, Sweden (1995)
Golden Plate Award of the American Academy of Achievement (1999)
Bruno Rossi Prize (2000)
Gruber Prize in Cosmology (2001)
Albert Einstein World Award of Science (2003)
Henry Norris Russell Lectureship of the American Astronomical Society (2004)
Lifeboat Foundation's Guardian Award (2004)
Royal Society's Michael Faraday Prize for science communication (2004)
Life Peerage (2005)
Crafoord Prize, with James Gunn and James Peebles (2005)
Order of Merit – the personal gift of The Queen (2007)
Caird Medal of the National Maritime Museum (2007)
Honorary Fellow of the Royal Academy of Engineering (2007)
Templeton Prize (2011)
Institute of Physics Isaac Newton Medal (2012)
Dirac Medal ICTP (2013)
Honorary Doctorate, Harvard University (awarded in Cambridge, Massachusetts, US on 26 May 2016)
Lilienfeld Prize (2017)
Fritz Zwicky Prize for Astrophysics and Cosmology (2020).
Elected a Legacy Fellow of the American Astronomical Society (2020).

The Asteroid 4587 Rees and the Sir Martin Rees Academic Scholarship at Shrewsbury International School are named in his honour.

In June 2022, to celebrate his 80th birthday, Rees was the subject of the BBC programme The Sky at Night, in conversation with Professor Chris Lintott.

Personal life
Rees married the anthropologist Caroline Humphrey in 1986. He is an atheist but has criticised militant atheists for being too hostile to religion. Rees is a lifelong supporter of the Labour Party, but has no party affiliation when sitting in the House of Lords.

See also
Particle chauvinism

References

1942 births
Living people
Foreign associates of the National Academy of Sciences
Plumian Professors of Astronomy and Experimental Philosophy
Academics of the University of Leicester
Academics of the University of Sussex
Albert Einstein World Award of Science Laureates
Alumni of Trinity College, Cambridge
Astronomers Royal
British astrophysicists
British cosmologists
English atheists
20th-century British astronomers
British physicists
Fellows of the Royal Society
Former Anglicans
Knights Bachelor
Trustees of the Institute for Advanced Study
Masters of Trinity College, Cambridge
Members of the Order of Merit
Members of the Norwegian Academy of Science and Letters
Members of the Royal Netherlands Academy of Arts and Sciences
Foreign Members of the Russian Academy of Sciences
People educated at Shrewsbury School
People's peers
Crossbench life peers
Presidents of the Royal Society
Recipients of the Gold Medal of the Royal Astronomical Society
Professors of Gresham College
People from York
Winners of the Dannie Heineman Prize for Astrophysics
UNESCO Niels Bohr Medal recipients
Fellows of the Academy of Medical Sciences (United Kingdom)
Presidents of the Royal Astronomical Society
Global Apollo Programme
Presidents of the Association for Science Education
Scientists from Yorkshire
20th-century atheists
21st-century atheists
Fellows of the American Astronomical Society
Recipients of the Dalton Medal
Honorary Fellows of the British Academy
21st-century British astronomers
Members of the American Philosophical Society
Scientific American people
Life peers created by Elizabeth II
Reeves family